The Cambridge Illustrated History of the Middle Ages is a three-volume work which was first written in French by Robert Fossier and published in 1982 as Le Moyen Age.  It was revised and translated for the Cambridge University Press by translators including Stuart Airlie, Robyn Marsack and Janet Sondheimer.

See also 
 The Cambridge Medieval History
 The New Cambridge Medieval History
 The Oxford Illustrated History of Medieval Europe

References

Cambridge University Press books
Historiography of Europe